Tamás Nádas (20 March 1969 – 7 March 2014) was a Hungarian aerobatics pilot and world champion air racer. He was born on 20 March 1969 in Hungary, and died when his plane crashed at an airshow in Qatar on 7 March 2014.

History
In 1998 at the age of 29 Nádas got into connection with flying thanks to a pleasure flight. He liked it so much that he started his pilot course that day. After a few months he got his license.

He was not satisfied with all this so he got into a Z-142 and continued his aviation career with aerobatics. His complete aerobatics training ended in 2001. He flew YAK-18, YAK-52 and Z-726, then single-seat machines: YAK-55M, ACRO-230, CAP-231, Z-50LS and he made the audience of several Hungarian events happy.

A milestone in his aviation career was the year of 2007 when his plane, designed for perfect aerobatics (EXTRA 300 LP), arrived. This aircraft let him take part in different races as a worthy opponent. The years of learning and practising took their fruit in the year of 2009.

On 7 March 2014 he was taking part in the Qatar Mile event at Al Khor Airport. While flying his Zivko Edge 540 and doing an inverted low pass of the airport, he lost control and crashed into the runway. Nádas later died from his injuries, thirteen days away from his 45th birthday.

Results

2009
 Hungarian Championship: gold medal
 European Championship programme Q: gold medal
 Czech Republic - international cup: silver medal
 Spain - Mediterranean cup: bronze medal

2010
 Hungarian Championship: gold medal
 World Championship: overall 8th place

2011
 Hungarian Championship: gold medal
 Republic of South Africa - season opener qualification aerobatics race: gold medal
 Hungarian Aviation Association: Aerobatics Pilot of the Year

2012
 Hungarian Championship: gold medal
 10th FAI World Advanced Aerobatic Championship Programme Free: gold medal

2013
 Hungarian Aviation Association: Aerobatics Pilot of the Year

References

External links

Official Website
Hármashatárhegyi Sportrepülésért Alapítvány
Jetfly
Official Facebook Page
World champion stunt pilot dies after crash at Al Khor air strip

1969 births
2014 deaths
Hungarian aviators
Hungarian air racers
Aerobatic pilots
Victims of aviation accidents or incidents in Qatar